MS Kriti I is a RO/PAX ship owned and operated by ANEK Lines. Along with El.Venizelos and her sister ship Kriti II she is the oldest ship in the fleet of ANEK Lines. The ship was built in 1979 at Koyo Dockyard, Japan and her original name was New Suzuran.

Service history

New Suzuran with her sister ship New Yukari bought from ANEK Lines in 1996. The constructions became in Perama, Greece in 1996. After the construction the new Kriti I with her sister ship Kriti II entered in Patras–Igoumenitsa–Corfu–Trieste route for many years. After the arrivals of the newest ships of ANEK Lines, the Japanese ferries Lefka Ori, Sophocles Venizelos, Kriti I' with her sister ship Kriti II entered in Piraeus–Heraklion route. Kriti I also made many replacements such as Patras–Igoumenitsa–Corfu–Venice route of oher ships of her company. The ship in 2013 chartered to an Italian company and did the Livorno–Olbia route but it was unsuccessful due to mechanical damage. The ship, after the charting, entered again to the Piraeus–Heraklion route but again chartered to a Russian company. The ship went in Novorossysk but never entered in service and returned in Piraeus. The ship laid-up many times and eventually, in the summer of 2016 Blue Star Ferries chartered it for Piraeus–Dodecanese route for Summer only. Eventually in 2017 Kriti I again chartered from Grandi Navi Veloci. In Italy the ship did the Civitavecchia–Termini Imerese route with Spledid. The ship was chartered for three years and in December 2019 Kriti I arrived in Piraeus and has been laid-up since then in Perama. The ship after a refit she enters again at Piraeus-Heraklion route.

References

External links
 

Ferries of Greece
1979 ships